Porphyrion is a Giant, and an opponent of Heracles in Greek mythology.

Porphyrion may also refer to:
 Pomponius Porphyrion, a Latin grammarian and commentator on Horace
 Porphyrion, a section of the genus Saxifraga
 Porphyrion (mythology), other figures in Greek mythology